Stan Pijnenburg (born 4 November 1996, in Haaren) is a Dutch swimmer.

He competed in the 4×100 m mixed freestyle relay event at the 2018 European Aquatics Championships, winning the silver medal.

Personal bests

References

External links
 

1996 births
Living people
Dutch male freestyle swimmers
Sportspeople from North Brabant
People from Haaren, North Brabant
Medalists at the FINA World Swimming Championships (25 m)
European Aquatics Championships medalists in swimming
Swimmers at the 2020 Summer Olympics
Olympic swimmers of the Netherlands
21st-century Dutch people